The 2006–07 National Division Three North was the seventh season (nineteenth overall) of the fourth division (north) of the English domestic rugby union competition using the name National Division Three North.  New teams to the division included Orrell who were relegated from the 2005–06 National Division Two while promoted teams included Rugby Lions who came up as champions of Midlands Division 1 as well as Morley (champions) and West Park St Helens who came up from North Division 1.  The league system was 4 points for a win, 2 points for a draw and additional bonus points being awarded for scoring 4 or more tries and/or losing within 7 points of the victorious team.  In terms of promotion the league champions would go straight up into National Division Two while the runners up would have a one-game playoff against the runners up from National Division Three South (at the home ground of the club with the superior league record) for the final promotion place.

At the end of the season Blaydon would pip Tynedale to the title by just one point with Tynedale actually having a better league record in terms of wins and draws but having fewer bonus points.  After missing out on the league title by the finest of margins, Tynedale would fail to gain promotion to the 2007–08 National Division Two at the second attempt losing away to the 2006–07 National Division Three South runners up Westcombe Park in the promotion playoff.  In terms of relegation Orrell would suffer their third relegation in a row, with just two draws all season, with the much more competitive Cleckheaton and Darlington going down at a later date.  In Darlington's case they finished level with newly promoted West Park St Helens, with the same number of wins but with more defeats as West Park managed to draw two extra games (despite having less bonus points).  Cleckheaton and Darlington would join North Division 1 for the subsequent season.  In the case of Orrell the impact of relegation was much more drastic as the club folded due to its financial backers pulling out.  However, an amateur version of the club would carry on playing in the South Lancs/Cheshire 2 league for 2007-08.

Participating teams and locations

Final league table

Results

Round 1

Round 2

Round 3

Round 4

Round 5

Round 6

Round 7

Round 8

Round 9

Round 10

Round 11 

Postponed.  Game rescheduled to 30 December 2006.

Round 12

Round 13

Round 14

Round 11 (rescheduled game) 

Game rescheduled from 25 November 2006.

Round 15

Round 16

Round 17

Round 18

Round 19

Round 20

Round 21

Round 22

Round 23

Round 24

Round 25 

Postponed.  Game rescheduled to 28 April 2007.

Round 26

Round 25 (rescheduled game) 

Game rescheduled from 14 April 2007.

Promotion play-off
The league runners up of National Division Three South and North would meet in a playoff game for promotion to National Division Two.  Westcombe Park were the southern division runners up and as they had a superior league record than northern runners-up, Tynedale, they hosted the play-off match.

Total season attendances

Individual statistics 

 Note that points scorers includes tries as well as conversions, penalties and drop goals.

Top points scorers

Top try scorers

Season records

Team
Largest home win — 124 pts
124 - 0  Blaydon at home to Orrell on 24 March 2007
Largest away win — 106 pts
106 - 0  Fylde away to Orrell on 31 March 2007
Most points scored — 124 pts
124 - 0  Blaydon at home to Orrell on 24 March 2007
Most tries in a match — 18
Blaydon at home to Orrell on 24 March 2007
Most conversions in a match — 17
Blaydon at home to Orrell on 24 March 2007
Most penalties in a match — 5 (x2)
Tynedale away to West Park St Helens on 2 September 2006
Rugby Lions at home to Fylde on 27 January 2007
Most drop goals in a match — 2
Fylde at home to Blaydon on 14 October 2006

Player
Most points in a match — 35
 Nick Royle for Fylde away to Orrell on 31 March 2007
Most tries in a match — 7
 Nick Royle for Fylde away to Orrell on 31 March 2007
Most conversions in a match — 17
 Anthony Mellalieu for Blaydon at home to Orrell on 24 March 2007
Most penalties in a match — 5 (x2)
 Phillip Belgian for Tynedale away to West Park St Helens on 2 September 2006
 James Hawken for Rugby Lions at home to Fylde on 27 January 2007
Most drop goals in a match — 2 (x2)
 John Armstrong for Fylde at home to Blaydon on 14 October 2006

Attendances
Highest — 1,987 
Fylde at home to Preston Grasshoppers on 23 December 2006
Lowest — 60 
Leicester Lions at home to Tynedale on 25 November 2006
Highest Average Attendance — 552
Fylde
Lowest Average Attendance — 117
Leicester Lions

See also
 English Rugby Union Leagues
 English rugby union system
 Rugby union in England

References

External links
 NCA Rugby

2006–07
2006–07 in English rugby union leagues